Cheongdam station is a station on the Seoul Subway Line 7. Wooridul Spine Hospital is located near the station.

Station layout

Vicinity
Exit 1: Bongeun Elementary & Middle Schools
Exit 2: Kyunggi High School, Bongeunsa
Exit 3:
Exit 4:
Exit 5:
Exit 6:
Exit 7: Gangnam District Office, Cheongdam Market
Exit 8: Eonbuk Elementary School
Exit 9:
Exit 10:
Exit 11: Cheongdam Park
Exit 12:
Exit 13: Riviera Hotel
Exit 14: Samik APT

Metro stations in Gangnam District
Seoul Metropolitan Subway stations
Railway stations opened in 2000